The following lists events that happened during 1889 in the Kingdom of Belgium.

Incumbents
Monarch: Leopold II
Prime Minister: Auguste Marie François Beernaert

Events

 6-25 May – Subversion trial in Mons reveals activity of security service agents provocateurs in the Parti socialiste républicain
 3 July – FN Herstal arms manufactory founded
 8 November – Higher Institute of Philosophy founded at Catholic University of Leuven

Publications
 Napoléon de Pauw, Obituarium Sancti Johannis: Nécrologe de l'église St. Jean (St. Bavon) à Gand, du XIIIe au XVIe siècle (Brussels, F. Hayez)
 Alexis Marie Gouchet, La traite des nègres et le croisade africaine (Liège)

Art and architecture

Paintings
 Rémy Cogghe, Cockfights in Flanders
 James Ensor, Christ's Entry Into Brussels in 1889
 Léon Herbo, Salome
 Fernand Khnopff, Memories
 Constantin Meunier, Firedamp

Births
 18 March – Floris Jespers, artist (died 1965)
 25 April – Paul Deman, cyclist (died 1961)
 26 May – Victor Linart, cyclist (died 1977)
 6 July – Louis Mottiat, cyclist (died 1972)
 30 July – Frans Masereel, artist (died 1972)
 8 October – Philippe Thys, cyclist (died 1971)
 11 November – Marcel Buysse, cyclist (died 1939)
 16 December – Joseph Van Daele, cyclist (died 1948)

Deaths

 15 April – Father Damien (born 1840), missionary
 2 July – Henri-Charles Lambrecht (born 1848), bishop of Ghent
 6 September – Guillaume d'Aspremont Lynden (born 1815), politician
 30 September – François-Antoine Bossuet (born 1798), painter
 16 October – Pierre-Joseph Witdoeck (born 1803), painter

References

 
1880s in Belgium
Belgium
Years of the 19th century in Belgium
Belgium